Nargan may refer to:
 Nargan, Isfahan
 Nargan, Sistan and Baluchestan